Lushuidao station is an interchange station between Line 6 and Line 8 (currently known as Phase II of Line 6) of Tianjin Metro in Tianjin, China, which opened on 28 December 2021.

Station structure

References

Railway stations in Tianjin
Railway stations in China opened in 2021
Tianjin Metro stations